Crisilla basteriae is a species of minute sea snail, a marine gastropod mollusk or micromollusk in the family Rissoidae.

Description
The shell grows to a length of 1.4 mm.

Distribution
This species occurs in European waters along the Canary Islands.

References

 an Dingenen F., Ceulemans L. & Landau B.M. (2016). The lower Pliocene gastropods of Le Pigeon Blanc (Loire-Atlantique, north west France), 2. Caenogastropoda. Cainozoic Research. 16(2): 109-219.
 Gofas, S.; Le Renard, J.; Bouchet, P. (2001). Mollusca, in: Costello, M.J. et al. (Ed.) (2001). European register of marine species: a check-list of the marine species in Europe and a bibliography of guides to their identification. Collection Patrimoines Naturels, 50: pp. 180–213

External links
 
 Moolenbeek R. & Faber M. (1986). A new micromollusc from the Canary Islands (Mollusca, Gastropoda: Rissoacea). Basteria 50: 177-180

Rissoidae
Gastropods described in 1986